Praveen Gupta (born 8 December 1986) is an Indian first-class cricketer who plays for Uttar Pradesh.

References

External links
 

1986 births
Living people
Indian cricketers
Uttar Pradesh cricketers
Sportspeople from Meerut